Wang Toi Shan is an area of Pat Heung, in Yuen Long District, Hong Kong.

Administration
Wang Toi Shan is a recognized village under the New Territories Small House Policy.

Villages
Villages in the area include:
 San Lung Wai
 Wang Toi Shan Ha San Uk
 Wang Toi Shan Ho Lik Pui
 Wang Toi Shan Lo Uk Tsuen
 Wang Toi Shan San Tsuen
 Wang Toi Shan Shan Tsuen
 Wang Toi Shan Wing Ning Lei
 Wang Toi Shan Yau Uk Tsuen

References

External links

 Delineation of area of existing village Wang Toi Shan Ha San Uk Tsuen (Pat Heung) for election of resident representative (2019 to 2022)
 Delineation of area of existing village Wang Toi Shan Ho Lik Pui Tsuen (Pat Heung) for election of resident representative (2019 to 2022)
 Delineation of area of existing village Wang Toi Shan Lo Uk Tsuen (Pat Heung) for election of resident representative (2019 to 2022)
 Delineation of area of existing village Wang Toi Shan Shan Tsuen (Pat Heung) for election of resident representative (2019 to 2022)
 Delineation of area of existing village Wang Toi Shan Wing Ning Lei Tsuen (Pat Heung) for election of resident representative (2019 to 2022)

Pat Heung
Populated places in Hong Kong